Anjaney Katirkama (born 28 January 1991) is a model and beauty queen based in Sri Lanka and India.

Modeling career 

Anjaney started modeling in India.

In 2006 she was selected for Miss Sri Lanka Universe and also became a finalist in the contest. Following that, she won the crown of Puthaandu Paenn (lady of the new year) contest in the same year.

She has done commercials for Huawei, Havelock City, Shakthi FM, 7 Up, Von Dutch, Prima Noodles, Seylan Bank, Surf Excel, Hatton National Bank, Shiga Center (Japan), Smirnoff, Coca-Cola, Fair & Lovely amongst others. She has been a fashion model for many shows in Asia.

Personal life
Anjaney is a vegetarian and an animal activist.

References 

Photo gallery
http://elakricollection.blogspot.com/2010/05/hot-collection.html

External links
http://www.mulpituwa.com/viewpicture-111198--Anjaney-Katirkama.htm

Sri Lankan female models
Living people
Sri Lankan beauty pageant winners
1991 births